SGW may refer to:
 Saginaw Seaplane Base, in Alaska
 Sebat Bet Gurage language
 Shinagawa Station, JR East station code
 Siġġiewi, Malta
 Signaling gateway
 Sloan Great Wall, a cosmic structure
 Sniper: Ghost Warrior, a video game series by CI Games
 Sons of Gwalia, a defunct Australian mining firm
 Stargate Worlds, an unreleased video game
 Serving Gateway, in the System Architecture Evolution standard